Labyrinthus plicatus is a species of air-breathing land snail, a terrestrial pulmonate gastropod mollusk in the family Labyrinthidae.

Distribution 
This species occurs in:
 Venezuela
 El Hatillo Municipality, Miranda, Venezuela
 Colombia
 Panama

References

External links 
 http://us.mirror.gbif.org/species/16076663
 photo of shell
 photo apical view of the shell from Panama
 photo basal view of the shell from Panama

Labyrinthidae
Gastropods described in 1780
Taxa named by Ignaz von Born